Kalpana Ranjani (5 October 1965 – 25 January 2016), better known mononymously as Kalpana, was an Indian actress who appeared in South Indian films, predominantly in Malayalam and Tamil. Kalpana has acted in over 300 films in various South Indian languages. She won the National Film Award for Best Supporting Actress for her performance in Thanichalla Njan (2012) at the 60th National Film Awards. Kalpana started her career as a child artist in the late 1970s. Although she came into the industry with the intention of being a lead actress, she turned out to be popular among the audiences for her comic roles.

Career

Kalpana began her career as a child artist in the film Vidarunna Mottukal. After making her debut as a mainstream actor in the 1980 film Pokkuveyil, directed by G. Aravindan, she went on to star in several critically acclaimed films and her portrayals as a comedian were appreciated by critics. Her Tamil debut was through the 1985 released successful film Chinna Veedu, opposite K. Bhagyaraj. Her other memorable films include Sathi Leelavathi (1995) and Kaliveedu (1996). She performed in a music album with Usha Uthup. She has published her memoirs, Njan Kalpana. Kalpana has sung a song in the movie Kudumbakodathi, along with K.S. Chithra, in which she appeared as a Telugu speaking character. She had an inevitable presence in stage shows. She was the chairperson of "Janaseva Shishu Bhavan" and assistant chairperson of "Street Birds" and a strong promoter of "Kudumbasree".She was the brand ambassador of "Leo Natura".

Personal life

Kalpana was born to theater artists Chavara V. P. Nair and Vijayalakshmi. Actors Kalaranjini and Urvashi are her sisters. She married Malayalam film director Anil Kumar in 1998 and got divorced in 2012. They have one daughter, Sreemayi and a son before getting divorced.

Death

Kalpana went to Hyderabad for the shooting of the movie Oopiri. On 25 January 2016, she was found unconscious in her hotel room and was immediately taken to the hospital by the crew members, but died of a heart attack on the way. Postmortem was conducted and her body was flown to her native place on 26 January 2016. The funeral took place on the same day.

Awards

2013 - National Film Award for Best Supporting Actress – for the film Thanichalla Njan
2016 - Asianet Film Awards for Best Supporting Actress - for the film Charlie (Posthumously awarded)
2016 - Henko Flowers Indian Film Awards for Best Supporting Actress - for the film Charlie (Posthumously awarded)
2016 - South Indian International Movie Awards  for Best Supporting Actress (Malayalam) -  for the film Charlie (Nominated only)
 2016 -  CPC Cine Awards for Best supporting actress - for the film Charlie (Nominated only)

Filmography

Malayalam

Tamil

Kannada

Telugu

Albums
 Palavattam

Television

Malayalam television
Serials
 Vamsham (DD Malayalam)
 Sathi Leelavathi (Amrita TV)
 Kudumbasametham Manikutty (Jaihind TV)
 Kochu Thresya Kochu (Kairali TV)
 Hukka Huvva Mikkado (Kairali TV)
 Jagapoga (Kairali TV)
 Aathma (Kairali TV)
 In Panchali House (Surya TV)
 Women's Club
 Irattavalan Kurup

As Host
 Ponkireedam (Jaihind TV)
 Manaporutham (Asianet)
 Star Singer (Asianet)
 Run Baby Run (Asianet Plus)
 Amrita Onam (Amrita TV)
 Onakinnaram (Surya TV)
 Payasaperumma (Jeevan TV)
 Vellithirayile Ambilikala (Kairali TV)
 Kalpana Show 2006 (DD Malayalam)
 The Kalpana Show 2002 (Asianet)
 Apratheekshitha Athithi : Ee Onam Ivarodoppam (Asianet)
 Only Ministers (Jaihind TV)
 Golden Moments
 K P Ummer Interview
 Mukesh.com Mega Show

Other shows

 Smart Show (Flowers)
 Comedy Super Nite (Flowers)
 Tharapakittu (Kaumudy TV)
 Cinema Company (Kaumudy TV)
 Deal or No Deal (Surya TV) 
 Hairomax Mrs. Kerala (Surya TV)
 Suryathejassod Amma (Surya TV)
 Suryaprabhayil Priyatharangal (Surya TV)
 Kitchen Tharangal (Surya TV)
 Super Dancer Junior (Amrita TV)
 Annie's Kitchen (Amrita TV)
 Malayali Durbar (Amrita TV)
 Vanitharatnam (Amrita TV)
 Star Family (Amrita TV)
 Ningalkkum Aakaam Kodeeshwaran(Asianet)
 Sarigama (Asianet)
 Saregamapadhanisa (Asianet)
 Idea Star Singer (Asianet)
 Sell Me The Answer (Asianet)
 Badai Bungalow (Asianet)
 Comedy Stars (Asianet)
 Smile Plz (Asianet Plus)
 Thiranottam (ACV)
 Ruchibhedam (ACV)
 Kerala's Favourite Film Actor (ACV)
 On Record (Asianet News)
 Onnum Onnum Moonu (Mazhavil Manorama)
 Cinema Chirima (Mazhavil Manorama)
 Idavelayil (Mazhavil Manorama)
 Katha Ithuvare (Mazhavil Manorama)
 Aniyarayil (Mazhavil Manorama)
 Nere Chovve (Manorama News)
 Veedu (Manorama News)
 Pachakuthira (Kairali TV)
 Star Wars (Kairali TV)
 Veettamma (Kairali TV)
 Chirikkum Pattanam (Kairali TV)
 JB Junction (Kairali TV)
 Students Only (Kairali TV)
 Jagapoga (Kairali TV)
 Love Bites (Kairali We)
 Ammayiyamma Marumakal Contest (Jaihind TV)
 Jeevitham Ithuvare (Jaihind TV)
 Ammaykku Oru Umma (Jaihind TV)
 Ini Njangal Parayam (DD Malayalam)
 2 Crore Apple Mega Star (Jeevan TV)
 Karunaniravil Kalpana 
 Mukhamukham Kalpana 
 Onam in Singapore
 Crossroads
 Tharaprabha
 Asiavision
Lux Asianet
Asianet Television Awards
Jaycey Awards
Kerala Kaumudi Onam Celebrations 2009
Malayalam Super Star Nite 1987
Arabian Dreams
Mazhavilazhakil Amma
Special Athithi
Kairali Cultural Association's Onam
Asianet Film Awards
Kerala Kalotsavam
Kerala Tourism Onam Celebrations
Siddique Lal's Cine Galaxy 94
Rhythm 92

Tamil television
Serials
 Chinna Papa Periya Papa Season 2 (Sun TV) as China Papa 
 Abirami (Kalaignar TV) as Kusalam
 Thangam (Sun TV) (guest role) as Kuchalambal
 Mama Maaple (Sun TV) as Parimalam
 Kathiravan (Sun TV) as Janu

References

External links
 
 En.msidb.org

1965 births
2016 deaths
Actresses from Kollam
Indian film actresses
People from Kollam district
Actresses in Malayalam cinema
Actresses in Tamil cinema
20th-century Indian actresses
21st-century Indian actresses
Indian women comedians
Malayalam comedians
Tamil comedians
Actresses in Telugu cinema
Actresses in Kannada cinema
Indian child actresses
Child actresses in Malayalam cinema
Indian autobiographers
Indian women non-fiction writers
Women autobiographers
Writers from Kollam
Actresses in Tamil television
Actresses in Malayalam television
Indian women television presenters
Indian voice actresses
Best Supporting Actress National Film Award winners